is a Japanese four-masted training barque tall ship. She was built in 1989 to replace a 1930 ship of the same name. The four masts are the fore mast, main mast, mizzen mast and jigger mast. Her complement is 199.

History
Her keel was laid by Sumitomo Heavy Industries on July 8, 1988 at the Uraga shipyard, near Yokohama, Japan. She was launched on March 7, 1989. Kaiwo Maru was commissioned on September 12, 1989. She is a four masted barque, over 110 meters in length, with a complement of 199. She is a sister ship of Nippon Maru.

On 20 Oct. 2004, Kaiwo Maru was nearly lost in Typhoon Tokage, while sheltering outside the port of Fushiki in the Bay of Toyama, Japan. She dragged her anchor and grounded on a breakwater, receiving severe damage. Her crew of 167, mostly young cadets, was evacuated. Helicopters responded, but were unable to drop lines. So rescuers fixed ropes to the breakwater and crewmembers climbed along them. Thirty were injured, including some with broken bones. Her captain later accepted responsibility. A month later she was lifted by a floating crane and returned to Uraga shipyard. The ship sailed again in January 2006 after major repairs.

Kaiwo Maru is a regular participant in international tall ship gatherings such as Operation Sail and is a multiple winner of the Boston Teapot Trophy. In 2010, Kaiwo Maru visited San Francisco, California to commemorate the 1860 voyage of the Kanrin Maru, the first Japanese ship to officially visit the United States. About 90 percent of the journey was made under sail, and they brought one passenger, a retired businessman who is descended from one of the original Kanrin Maru crew members.

In March 2011, Kaiwo Maru was on a voyage from Japan to Honolulu, Hawaii when an earthquake and tsunami struck Japan. She was subsequently diverted to Ōkuma, Fukushima where she served as accommodation for workers tackling the nuclear crisis at the Fukushima I Nuclear Power Plant.

See also
List of large sailing vessels
List of tall ships
JDS Kashima (TV-3508)

References

External links

National Institute for Sea Training
Photos

1989 ships
Merchant ships of Japan
Ships built by Sumitomo Heavy Industries
Training ships of Japan
Tall ships of Japan

ja:海王丸